Andrzej Kopiczyński (15 April 1934 – 13 October 2016) was a Polish actor. He appeared in more than 50 films and television between 1958 and 2016.

Selected filmography
 Copernicus (1973)
 Czterdziestolatek (1974-1977) 
 Korczak (1990)
 With Fire and Sword (1999)

References

External links

1934 births
2016 deaths
People from Międzyrzec Podlaski
Polish male film actors
Polish male television actors
Polish male stage actors